is a railway station in the town of Kawanehon, Haibara District, Shizuoka Prefecture, Japan, operated by the Ōigawa Railway.

Lines

Station layout
The station has a single island platform connected to a small wooden station building by a level crossing. The station is staffed.

Adjacent stations

|-
!colspan=5|Ōigawa Railway

Station history
Suruga-Tokuyama Station was one of the original stations of the Ōigawa Main Line, and was opened on April 12, 1931.

Passenger statistics
In fiscal 2017, the station was used by an average of 37 passengers daily (boarding passengers only).

Surrounding area
Japan National Route 362*Kawanehon High School

See also
 List of Railway Stations in Japan

References

JTB, Nihon no Testudo Issan (日本の鉄道遺産). JTB Printing (2012)

External links

 Ōigawa Railway home page

Stations of Ōigawa Railway
Railway stations in Shizuoka Prefecture
Railway stations in Japan opened in 1931
Kawanehon, Shizuoka